The French (Reformed) Church of Friedrichstadt (and commonly known as Französischer Dom, meaning 'French cathedral') is in Berlin at the Gendarmenmarkt, across the Konzerthaus and the German Cathedral. The earliest parts of the church date back to 1701, although it was subsequently expanded. After being heavily damaged during World War II, the church was rebuilt and continues to offer church services and concerts.

Name
The church is officially known as the "French Church of Friedrichstadt", but is commonly referred to as Französischer Dom, or "French Cathedral". Despite their names, neither of the churches on Gendarmenmarkt is a cathedral, as neither was ever seat of a bishop; instead, the name element Dom ("cathedral" in German) refers to the French word "dôme" (dome/cupola), using terminology as a relic of francophone Frederick the Great, who was instrumental in enhancing Gendarmenmarkt.

History
Louis Cayart and Abraham Quesnay built the first parts of the French Church between 1701 and 1705 for the Huguenot (Calvinist) community. During this time, Huguenots constituted about 25 percent of the city population. The French Church was modelled after the destroyed Huguenot temple in Charenton-Saint-Maurice, France.

In 1785, Carl von Gontard modified the church and built an adjacent domed tower, which eventually gave the church its name. Technically speaking, the tower is not part of the church, and both buildings have different proprietors. The tower was built to embellish the Gendarmenmarkt ensemble at the instigation of Frederick the Great. The Deutscher Dom, however, on the other side of Gendarmenmarkt, consists of church building and tower as an entity.

In 1817, the French Church community, like most Prussian Calvinist Reformed and Lutheran congregations joined the common umbrella organization "Evangelical Church in Prussia", with each congregation maintaining its former denomination or adopting the new united denomination. The community of the "French Church of Friedrichstadt" maintained its Calvinist denomination. 

Nevertheless, already before the union of the Prussian Protestants the congregation underwent a certain acculturation with Lutheran traditions: in 1753, an organ was installed, competing with the Calvinist tradition of congregational singing without accompaniment. The singing of psalms was extended by hymns in 1791. The sober interior was refurbished in a more decorative but still Calvinist aniconistic style by Otto March in 1905. Today's community is part of the Evangelical Church of Berlin-Brandenburg-Silesian Upper Lusatia.

The Französischer Dom was severely damaged during World War II and rebuilt between 1977 and 1981. Today, it is used by its congregations, and for conventions of the Evangelical Church in Germany.

The public observation deck of the domed tower offers a panoramic view of the downtown area. There is a restaurant in the basement underneath the sanctuary. The tower also contains the Berlin Huguenot museum.

References

External links

 

Reformed church buildings in Germany
Friedrichstadt Church
Friedrichstadt Church
Friedrichstadt Church
Berlin Friedrichstadt Church
Friedrichstadt Church
Berlin Friedrichstadt Church
Huguenot history in Germany